Alexander Akwasi Acquah is the member of parliament for the Akim Oda constituency in Ghana's 8th parliament under the fourth republic. The first time MP was elected on the ticket of the New Patriotic Party (NPP). With a majority of 25,380 votes out of the 31,943 total votes cast (which represents 79.45%), he defeated his opponents and won the seat as the 5th MP for the Constituency. He succeeded William Quaitoo who represented the constituency for eight (8) years from 2012 to 2020 on the ticket of the New Patriotic Party (NPP). Before him was Yaw Owusu-Boateng as the member of parliament for the constituency for four (4) years (2008-2012) until a new constituency was created out of the Akim Oda constituency in 2012 which had him representing the newly created Constituency, Asene Akoroso Manso on the ticket of the New Patriotic Party (NPP) that year.
.

Members of Parliament

Elections

 
 
 
 
 
 
 

Alexander Akwasi Acquah was elected as MP for the constituency in 2020 with 25,380 votes representing 79.45% on the ticket of NPP.

See also
List of Ghana Parliament constituencies

References

External links
Adam Carr's Election Archives
Election Passport - American University

Parliamentary constituencies in the Eastern Region (Ghana)